Welcome to the Club is a 1959 album by Nat King Cole, arranged by Dave Cavanaugh. Cole is accompanied by an uncredited Count Basie Orchestra, without Count Basie himself.

Welcome to the Club was chosen as one of Billboard magazine's 'Spotlight Winners of the Week' upon its release in February 1959. Billboard commented that "Cole works out on a group of swinging, jazz-oriented offerings with interesting backings by Dave Cavanaugh...Cole himself, as usual, is fine and somewhat reminiscent of his earlier swinging efforts." The review also noted the similarity of the album's arrangements to Count Basie's, and praised Cole's efforts on the blues tracks, "I Want a Little Girl" and "Wee Baby Blues".

Track listing
 "Welcome to the Club" (Noel Sherman, Dick Wolf) – 2:44	
 "Anytime, Anyday, Anywhere" (Ned Washington, Lee Wiley, Victor Young) – 2:19	
 "The Blues Don't Care" (Vic Abrams) – 2:10
 "Mood Indigo" (Barney Bigard, Duke Ellington, Irving Mills) – 3:21	
 "Baby Won't You Please Come Home" (Charles Warfield, Clarence Williams) – 2:11
 "The Late, Late Show" (Roy Alfred, Murray Berlin) – 2:32	
 "Avalon" (Buddy DeSylva, Al Jolson, Billy Rose) – 1:45	
 "She's Funny That Way" (Neil Moret, Richard Whiting) – 3:02	
 "I Want a Little Girl" (Murray Mencher, Billy Moll) – 2:49
 "Wee Baby Blues" (Pete Johnson, Big Joe Turner) – 3:16	
 "Look Out for Love" (Danny Meehan, Colin Romoff) – 1:58

Personnel

 Nat King Cole – vocal
 Dave Cavanaugh – arranger, conductor
 The Count Basie Orchestra
consisting of:
 Marshall Royal – alto saxophone
 Frank Wess – alto saxophone
 Frank Foster – tenor saxophone
 Billy Mitchell – tenor saxophone
 Charlie Fowlkes – baritone saxophone
 John Anderson – trumpet
 Joe Newman – trumpet
 Wendell Culley – trumpet
 Thad Jones – trumpet
 Snooky Young – trumpet
 Henry Coker – trombone
 Benny Powell – trombone
 Al Grey – trombone
 Gerald Wiggins – piano
 Freddie Green – guitar
 Eddie Jones – bass
 Sonny Payne – drums

References

1959 albums
Albums arranged by Dave Cavanaugh
Albums conducted by Dave Cavanaugh
Capitol Records albums
Count Basie Orchestra albums
Nat King Cole albums
Albums recorded at Capitol Studios